Anderlecht is one of the 19 municipalities of the Brussels-Capital Region, Belgium. Located in the south-western part of the region, it is bordered by the City of Brussels, Forest, Molenbeek-Saint-Jean, and Saint-Gilles, as well as the Flemish municipalities of Dilbeek and Sint-Pieters-Leeuw. In common with all of Brussels' municipalities, it is legally bilingual (French–Dutch).

There are several historically and architecturally distinct districts within Anderlecht. , the municipality had a population of around 122,547. Its upper area is greener and less densely populated.

History

Origins and medieval times
The first traces of human activity on the right bank of the Senne date from the Stone Age and Bronze Age. The remnants of a Roman villa and of a Frankish necropolis were also found on the territory of Anderlecht. The first mention of the name Anderlecht, however, dates only from 1047 under the forms Anrelech, then Andrelet (1111), Andreler (1148), and Anderlech (1186). At that time, this community was already home to a chapter of canons and to two feudal manors, those of the powerful lords of Aa and of Anderlecht.

In 1356, the Count of Flanders, Louis II, fought against Brussels on the territory of Anderlecht, in the so-called Battle of Scheut, supposedly over a monetary matter. Although he defeated his sister-in-law, the Duchess of Brabant, Joanna, and briefly took her title, she regained it the following year with the help of the Holy Roman Emperor, Charles IV. In 1393, Joanna's charter made Anderlecht a part of Brussels. It is also around this time that the church of Saint Guy was rebuilt above an earlier Romanesque crypt in the Brabantian Gothic style.

15th–18th centuries
The village of Anderlecht became a beacon of culture in the 15th and 16th centuries. In 1521, the Dutch humanist writer and theologian Erasmus of Rotterdam lived in the canons' house for a few months. Charles, Duke of Aumale and Grand Veneur of France also had a residence there.

The 17th and 18th centuries were marked by the wars between the Low Countries and France. During the Nine Years' War, it is from the high ground of Scheut, in the northern part of Anderlecht, that the bombardment of Brussels of 1695 took place. Together with the resulting fire, it was the most destructive event in the entire history of Brussels. On 13 November 1792, right after the Battle of Jemappes, General Dumouriez and the French Revolutionary army routed the Austrians there once again. Among the consequences were the disbanding of the canons and Anderlecht being proclaimed an independent municipality by the French.

By the end of the 18th century, Anderlecht including its dependencies, which extended to Brussels' city walls, counted around 2,000 inhabitants. In Scheut, on the site of the Carthusian Monastery, stood a chapel called Our Lady of Scheut, whose pleasant location, in the middle of a grove, made this place very popular at the time.

19th century and later
The 19th century saw a remarkable population growth, mainly because of the proximity to a rapidly expanding Brussels. The / was laid out in 1828, through the former property of the Carthusians. The population multiplied by ten between 1830 and 1890 and doubled again between 1890 and 1910. Along the / and the Brussels–Charleroi Canal, a series of industrial and working-class districts connected the centre of Anderlecht to Cureghem.

Remarkable new urban developments and garden cities such as La Roue/Het Rad, Moortebeek and / were built at the beginning of the 20th century to house the influx of newcomers. Following World War II, some remaining green parts of the municipality also made way for large-scale urban renewal following the modernist Athens Charter and Park system, such as the housing projects Scherdemael, Peterbos and Marius Renard in the upper town, and Aurore near the canal.

Nowadays, the name Anderlecht rings a bell in every Belgian ear thanks to its very successful football club.

Geography

Location

It is the westernmost municipality in the Brussels-Capital Region and is an important crossing point for the Brussels–Charleroi Canal, which cuts the municipality in two from the west. It is bordered by the City of Brussels, Forest, Molenbeek-Saint-Jean, and Saint-Gilles, as well as the Flemish municipalities of Dilbeek and Sint-Pieters-Leeuw.

Climate
Anderlecht, in common with the rest of Brussels, experiences an oceanic climate (Köppen: Cfb) with warm summers and cool winters. Proximity to coastal areas influences the area's climate by sending marine air masses from the Atlantic Ocean. Nearby wetlands also ensure a maritime temperate climate. On average (based on measurements in the period 1981–2010), there are approximately 135 days of rain per year in the region. Snowfall is infrequent, averaging 24 days per year. It also often experiences violent thunderstorms in summer months.

The Royal Meteorological Institute of Belgium (IRM/KMI) is located in Uccle, in the south of Brussels. The meteorological records which are carried out there are similar to those which could be carried out in Anderlecht.

Districts

The territory of Anderlecht is very heterogeneous and is characterised by a mixture of larger districts including smaller residential and (formerly) industrial neighbourhoods.

Historical centre

The historical centre of Anderlecht is the municipality's central district. Formerly known as Rinck, it is divided into several sectors: 
 The / district, also called the / district, is the meeting point for those who hail to the heart of Anderlecht. It is also where the Place de la Vaillance/Dapperheidsplein (Anderlecht's central square), the Church of St. Guido, the /, as well as Anderlecht's main schools are located. The / is the municipality's main shopping street. It is centred on the / and some neighbouring streets. 
 The smaller Aumale district in its northern part mainly comprises the / and its surrounding streets. It includes the Erasmus House (a museum devoted to the Dutch humanist writer and theologian Erasmus of Rotterdam), the old beguinage (a type of lay convent common in the Late Middle Ages in the Low Countries and the Rhineland), as well as the Bibliothèque de l'Espace Maurice Carême French-language public library.

Cureghem/Kuregem
Located in the east of Anderlecht, / is one of the municipality's largest and most populated districts. It developed during the Industrial Revolution along the Brussels–Charleroi Canal and is currently in a fragile social and economic situation due to the decline of its economy and the poor quality of some of its housing. Between 1836 and 1991, the district housed the Royal School of Veterinary Medicine, now moved to Liège but often still referred to as Cureghem. The old campus, listed as protected heritage, is currently undergoing a large rehabilitation process.

Three listed buildings; the former Atlas Brewery, the old power station, and the former Moulart Mill, are testaments to the old industrial activities next to the waterway. The Municipal Hall of Anderlecht is located on the /, at the heart of this district. In its lower part, bordering the City of Brussels, are the Square de l'Aviation/Luchtvaartsquare and the /.

La Roue/Het Rad

Located in the south of Anderlecht, / ("The Wheel") is one of the municipality's largest districts and one of Brussels' main garden cities. Built in the 1920s, with its modest and picturesque houses, it offers a great vision of an early 20th century working class neighbourhood. It is also home to one of the largest agribusiness industry campuses in Belgium; the Food and Chemical Industries Education and Research Center (CERIA/COOVI), as well as popular department stores.

Scheut

Located in the north of Anderlecht, Scheut is bounded by the border with the municipality of Molenbeek-Saint-Jean to the north, the historical centre of Anderlecht to the south, the Birmingham district to the east, the Scheutveld district to the west and the semi-natural site of the Scheutbos to the north-west.

It is in this district, on the /, that lay the foundations of the Scheutveld College, on 28 April 1863, by the Catholic priest Theophile Verbist. The congregation of Scheut Missionaries went on to evangelise China, Mongolia, the Philippines, as well as the Congo Free State/Belgian Congo (modern-day Democratic Republic of the Congo).

Main sights
Anderlecht has a rich cultural and architectural heritage. Some of the main points of interest include:
 The Collegiate Church of St. Peter and St. Guido is located in the municipality's historical centre, on the northern side of the Place de la Vaillance/Dapperheidsplein, its main square. It contains the grave of the 11th century saint Guy of Anderlecht. Its Romanesque crypt dates from the 10th century and is one of the oldest in Belgium. Most of the church, however, dates from 1350 and later, with most of the currently visible architecture representing the Ogee style (15th–16th centuries). Construction of the tower started in 1517 but stopped with the square part up to the balcony, and was not completed until 1898.
 The Erasmus House, built between 1460 and 1515, with its medicinal and philosophical gardens, can be visited nearby. Right next to the church, the old beguinage is home to a local historical museum. Both institutions are now managed jointly as the Erasmus House and Beguinage Museums.
 The National Museum of the Resistance, which traces the history of the Belgian Resistance and German occupation of Belgium during World War II.
 The Museum of China – Scheut, which houses documents and pieces brought back to Europe by the congregation of Scheut Missionaries, including a 15th-century bronze Buddha.
 The Maurice Carême Museum, in the  where the Belgian poet lived and wrote.
 The Luizenmolen in Neerpede, a replica of an old windmill which once stood on the site.
 The Cureghem Cellars (French: ,), a subterranean complex of handmade brick caves with Romanesque vaults, pillars, and arches, originally the site of a cattle market covered by a forged-iron roof construction in the 1890s. The cellars were simply a foundation for the upper structure until the 1930s, after which the city council decided to make better use of them. It proved more profitable to grow mushrooms in the dark and damp underground spaces for local consumption. It fell into disuse as a cattle market but, in 1984, the hall officially got listed as a Belgian monument. Due to its characteristic architecture and unique layout it was refurbished and transformed by a private company, Abattoir SA. Since 1992, it serves as an attractive and functional event site for various private, corporate or public occasions and events. One of these was the anatomic exposition Body Worlds by Dr. Gunther Von Hagens, which ran in the cellars between 2008 and 2009 and attracted over 500,000 visitors.
 The Cantillon Brewery, a gueuze museum established in an actual working brewery.
 The Museum of Medicine, located on the Erasme/Erasmus campus of the Université libre de Bruxelles (ULB).
 The Jean-Claude Van Damme statue located on the /, near the Westland Shopping Center.

Demographics

Historical population
Historically, the population of Anderlecht was quite low. The municipality counted around 2,000 inhabitants at the beginning of the 19th century. However, following the Industrial Revolution, the population underwent a remarkable growth, peaking at 103,796 in 1970. From then, it began to decrease slightly to a low of 87,812 in 2000, before increasing again rapidly in recent years.

, the population was 120,887.

 Sources: INS: 1806 to 1981= census; 1990 and later = population on 1 January

Foreign population
Migrant communities in Anderlecht with over 1,000 people as of 1 January 2020:

Politics
The current city council was elected in the October 2018 elections. The current mayor of Anderlecht is Fabrice Cumps, a member of PS, who alongside the other parties on their list, sp.a and cdH, is in coalition on the municipal council with Ecolo - Groen, DéFI and Forward.

Events
The annual Anderlecht fair, originally a cattle fair, was authorised by William II of the Netherlands in 1825. Since then, it has taken the form of a series of celebrations, which still include animal shows but also a large market, a floral show, and the recreation of a religious procession in honour of Saint Guy.

Economy

The , located at 24, / in Cureghem, is the main slaughterhouse in Brussels, employing some 1,500 people. In addition to its main activities, the great hall serves as a covered market for food and flea markets.

In recent years, several major international companies have set up their headquarters in Anderlecht, notably the Delhaize Group, which operates many supermarket chains, from 40, Marie Curie Square, Coca-Cola Benelux at 1424, /, as well as the Belgian chocolate company Leonidas at 41, /.

Healthcare
Several hospitals and clinics are located in Anderlecht:
 Erasmus Hospital
 Institut Jules Bordet
 Joseph Bracops Hospital
 St. Anne St. Remigius Clinic

Sports

Football
Anderlecht is the home of the football club RSC Anderlecht, the most successful Belgian football team in European competition as well as in the Belgian First Division with 34 titles. The club's home stadium is the Constant Vanden Stock Stadium, located within Astrid Park. The team colours are white and purple.

Parks and green spaces

Green spaces in the municipality include:
 Astrid Park
 /, in Scheut
 Scherdemael Park
 Peterbos Park
 Joseph Lemaire Park
 Jean Vives Park
 /, in Neerpede
 /, in Cureghem
 The Vogelzang or Vogelenzang, a natural protected area

Famous inhabitants

 Guy of Anderlecht ( 950–1012), known as the Poor Man of Anderlecht, patron saint of Anderlecht
 Adrian VI (1459–1523), pope, theologian, rector at the University of Leuven, canon at the Chapter of Anderlecht, lived there.
  (1900–1966), politician and mayor of Anderlecht
 Jacques Brel, singer-songwriter and actor. He lived from 1942 to 1951 at 7, /, and worked from 1946 to 1953 in the family cardboard box factory Vanneste & Brel (now SCA Packaging) at 18, /. A nearby metro station is named after him. 
 Maurice Carême (1899–1978), poet
 Fernand Dineur (1904–1956), cartoonist
 , also known as Zidrou (b. 1962), comic book artist
 Desiderius Erasmus (1466–1536), humanist and theologian
  (1939–2006), actor, stage manager and professor of the Théâtre royal des Galeries
  (1921–2014), architect
 Désiré Keteleer (1920–1970), cyclist
 Filip Peeters (b. 1962), Flemish actor
 Germaine Schneider (1903–1945), Belgian-Swiss member of the Resistance during World War II
 Henri Seroka (b. 1949), singer and composer
 Henri Simonet (1931–1996), politician and mayor of Anderlecht
 Jacques Simonet (1963–2007), politician, mayor of Anderlecht, and Minister-President of the Brussels-Capital Region
  (1899–1981), architect
 Philippe Thys (1889–1971), cyclist and three-time champion of the Tour de France
 Tonia (Arlette Antoine Dominicus) (b. 1947), singer, represented Belgium at the 11th Eurovision Song Contest in 1966
 Toots Thielemans (1922–2016), jazz musician, lived there.
 William Vance (b. 1935), comic book artist
 Constant Vanden Stock (1914–2008), entrepreneur, footballer, functionary, and coach of the Belgium national team
 Virgile Vandeput (b. 1994), Belgian-born alpine skier who competes for Israel
 Régine Zylberberg, better known as Régine (b. 1929), chanson singer, actress and nightclub entrepreneur

Born in Anderlecht:
 Princess Elisabeth, Duchess of Brabant (b. 2001), Duchess of Brabant, the eldest child of King Philippe and Queen Mathilde; heiress 
 Princes Gabriel and Emmanuel and Princess Eléonore; 2nd, 3rd and 4th in line to the throne of Belgium
 Yannick Mertens (b. 1987), professional tennis player

International relations

Twin towns and sister cities
Anderlecht is twinned with:
  Boulogne-Billancourt, France
  Berlin-Neukölln, Germany
  London Borough of Hammersmith and Fulham, United Kingdom
  Zaandam, Netherlands
  Marino, Italy

In addition, Anderlecht has signed a friendship agreement with:
  Sainte-Maxime, France

References

Notes

Bibliography

External links

 
 Official website 

 
Municipalities of the Brussels-Capital Region
Populated places in Belgium
Belgium geography articles needing translation from French Wikipedia